The R702 is a Regional Route in South Africa that connects Bloemfontein with the Lesotho border at Van Rooyen's Gate via Dewetsdorp and Wepener.

Route
Its north-western terminus is a junction with the N6 National Route and M30 Metropolitan Route in Bloemfontein, Mangaung Metropolitan Municipality, just south of the Mangaung Suburb. It goes eastwards to reach a t-junction, where it meets the southern terminus of Bloemfontein's M12 Metropolitan Route and turns south-east.

It leaves the city heading south-east and goes for 56 kilometres to the town of Dewetsdorp, where it meets the north-eastern terminus of the R717. From the R717 junction, it continues south-east for 32 kilometres to meet the R26 and the north-eastern terminus of the R701 at a four-way-junction. It becomes co-signed with the R26 eastwards, immediately crossing the Caledon River into the town of Wepener.

South of Wepener town centre, the R702 becomes its own road northwards into the city centre as Van Aardt Street, then eastwards as Spies Street to cross the Sandspruit River. Just after Wepener Police Station, the R702 becomes the road to the south-east and goes for 8 kilometres to end at the Van Rooyen's Gate border post with Lesotho, after which the route becomes Lesotho's A20.

References 

Regional Routes in the Free State (province)